Luis Miguel is a Mexican singer.

Luis Miguel may also refer to:
Luis Miguel (album), a 2010 album by Luis Miguel
Luis Miguel (TV series), a 2018 biographical television series

People with the given name
Alhandra (footballer) (born 1979), full name Luís Miguel Assunção Joaquim, Portuguese footballer
Luis Miguel Dominguín (1926–1996), bullfighter from Spain
Luis Miguel Escalada (born 1986), Argentine footballer
Luis Miguel Martín (born 1972), Spanish runner
Luis Miguel Sánchez Cerro (1889–1933), President of Peru
Luismi (footballer, born 1979), full name Luis Miguel Loro Santiago, Spanish footballer
Luismi (footballer, born 1983), full name Luis Miguel Gracia Julián, Spanish footballer
Luismi Quezada (born 1996), full name Luis Miguel Quezada Sánchez, Dominican footballer
Luis Miguel Hernández (born 1985), Salvadoran footballer
Luís Miguel (footballer, born 1971), full name Luís Miguel da Fonseca Silva Costa, Angolan footballer and manager
Luís Miguel (footballer, born 1972), full name Luís Miguel Fontes Martins, Portuguese retired footballer
Luís Miguel (footballer, born 1979), full name Luís Miguel da Costa Lobo, Portuguese retired footballer
Luís Miguel (footballer, born 1991), full name Luís Miguel Silva Mendonça, Portuguese footballer
Mano (Portuguese footballer) (born 1987), full name Luís Miguel Lopes Mendes, Portuguese footballer
Miguel Barbosa Huerta (born 1959), full name Luis Miguel Gerónimo Barbosa Huerta, Mexican politician
Miguel Monteiro (born 1980), full name Luís Miguel Brito Garcia Monteiro, Portuguese footballer

See also